Driehuis is a Dutch surname. Notable people with the surname include:

Ingelise Driehuis (born 1967), Dutch tennis player
Kees Driehuis (1951–2019), Dutch television presenter
Wim Driehuis (born 1943), Dutch economist

Dutch-language surnames